The 1916 Idaho gubernatorial election was held on November 7, 1916. Incumbent Democrat Moses Alexander defeated Republican nominee D. W. Davis with 47.49% of the vote.

General election

Candidates
Major party candidates
Moses Alexander, Democratic
D. W. Davis, Republican

Other candidates
Annie E. Triplow, Socialist

Results

References

1916
Idaho
Gubernatorial